Pakenham Hall may refer to:
Pakenham Hall, County Westmeath or Pakenham Hall Castle, the former name of Tullynally Castle
Pakenham Hall, Suffolk